William Joseph White (born 1947) is an American Anglican bishop who served as bishop ordinary of the Reformed Episcopal Church's Diocese of the Southeast.

Biography
White was born in St. Stephen, South Carolina. He received his M.Div. from Cummins Theological Seminary in Summerville, South Carolina. He served several churches in the Diocese of the Southeast as a presbyter before being elected as suffragan bishop in the diocese.

On January 17, 2009, White was consecrated as the suffragan bishop of the Diocese of the Southeast at New Israel Reformed Episcopal Church in Charleston. REC Presiding Bishop Leonard W. Riches was the chief consecrator, joined by Sanco K. Rembert, Alphonza Gadsden, Royal U. Grote Jr., David L. Hicks, and Ray R. Sutton.

White was elected bishop coadjutor in 2015, and on December 12, 2020, he succeeded Gadsden as the eighth bishop ordinary of the Southeast. In September 2022, White retired. Bishop co-adjutor Willie J. Hill Jr. was installed to succeed White as the ninth bishop ordinary during the diocese's annual synod.

Personal life

White married Vivian Jenkins in 1970; she died in 2018. They have two surviving children and one deceased child. In 2020, White was remarried to Gail Wilson.

References

External links
 Diocesan website profile

1947 births
Living people
Bishops of the Anglican Church in North America
21st-century Anglican bishops in the United States
Bishops of the Reformed Episcopal Church
African-American Christian clergy